Operation Handclasp was a 1958 joint Air Force-Navy operation conducted with the U.S. Navy's U.S. 7th Fleet to demonstrate military weapons for Asian political and military leaders.

Example of use 
DANFS contains numerous references to this operation. For example, see USS Alvin C. Cockrell (DE-366).

Operation Handclasp is not to be confused with Project Handclasp an official U.S. Navy program that distributes materials donated in the U.S. to less economically well-off residents of foreign countries on behalf of American citizens.

References 

Handclasp